The MT class were eight motor torpedo boats that served with the Yugoslav Navy post-World War II. They were originally built for the United States Navy by Higgins Industries as patrol torpedo boats, and served in the Mediterranean Sea with them, before being transferred to the Royal Navy at Malta in late 1944. All survived the war to be taken over by the Yugoslav Navy, with one being deleted in 1955, and the rest struck off in 1966.

Background

The United States Navy first became interested in motor torpedo boats (MTBs) in the mid-1930s, due to overseas developments in the type. The US Navy imported some British MTBs and developed prototypes of their own. Production patrol torpedo boat (PT boat) models were built from March 1942 onwards by a number of manufacturers, including Higgins Industries of New Orleans. Initial armament was four torpedo tubes and two twin  machine gun mounts, although the tubes were replaced by racks, and the gun armament was progressively upgraded as the war continued. Production batches were generally in multiples of 12 boats, as this was the size of a US Navy Motor Torpedo Boat Squadron (MTBRon).

Description and construction
Higgins built several batches of PT boats from the first "Maximum Effort Program" series contract signed on 25 March 1942, comprising PT197–PT254. This included PT201 –PT218, which were built in 1943. The crew consisted of 17 officers and enlisted men.

During their service, their armament had been significantly enhanced, so that by August 1944, their gun armament consisted of one Bofors  gun on the stern, and two Oerlikon
 guns, one on the bow and one just forward of the 40 mm mount. The two twin M2 Browning 12.7 mm machine gun mounts were located on either side of the bridge, and there were also two single Browning M1919  machine guns amidships. Four  Mark 13 torpedoes were carried in racks, with two on either side, one amidships and one on the rear deck just forward of the rear gun.

Service history
MTBRon 15 was commissioned on 20 January 1943. After fit-out and training of crews, MTBRon 15 was based in the Mediterranean Sea under the tactical control of British Royal Navy coastal forces. PT202 and PT218 were mined in August 1944, and the remaining boats of MTBRon 15, PT201, PT203–PT217, were transferred to the Royal Navy in October 1944. In August 1945, PT201, PT204, PT207–PT209, PT211, PT213 and PT217 were transferred to the Yugoslav Navy that had grown out of the maritime forces of the Yugoslav Partisans. They remained in service until 1966, except for one boat that was deleted in 1955. The boats were considered a successful type, and were copied by the Yugoslavs, who made 96 similar boats between 1951 and 1960.

Footnotes

References
 
 
 

Ships of the Yugoslav Navy
Gunboats of the Royal Navy
Ships transferred from the United States Navy to the Royal Navy
PT boats